One of Several Possible Musiks is the sixth solo album by musician Kerry Livgren. The album won a Dove Award for Instrumental Album of the Year.

Reception
In his review, Allmusic editor Mark W.B. Allender praises Kerry Livgren's work as, "a spectacular collection of songs that highlight Livgren's prowess as a composer better than any of his previous releases and his ability as a performer free to explore musically with little restraint. Great guitar work abounds, and it is mystical, almost dreamy in places."

Track listing
"Ancient Wing" - 4:12
"And I Saw, as It Were...Konelrad" - 4:53
"Colonnade Gardens" - 4:07
"In the Sides of the North" - 4:22
"Alenna in the Sun" - 4:16
"Tannin Danse" - 3:34
"The Far Country" - 3:43
"Diaspora" - 3:32
"A Fistful of Drachma" - 4:05
"Tenth of Nisan" - 4:45

Personnel
 Kerry Livgren - multi instruments, producer, composer, engineer, mixing
 Glenn Meadows - mastering

Accolades
GMA Dove Award

References

1989 albums
Kerry Livgren albums